West Tyrone was a constituency of the Parliament of Northern Ireland.

Boundaries
West Tyrone was a county constituency comprising the western part of County Tyrone. It was created when the House of Commons (Method of Voting and Redistribution of Seats) Act (Northern Ireland) 1929 introduced first-past-the-post elections throughout Northern Ireland. West Tyrone was created by the division of Fermanagh and Tyrone into eight new constituencies, of which five were in County Tyrone. The constituency survived unchanged, returning one member of Parliament until the Parliament of Northern Ireland was temporarily suspended in 1972, and then formally abolished in 1973.

The seat was dominated by the town of Omagh, and also included parts of the rural districts of Castlederg and Omagh.

Politics 
The constituency was consistently won by members of the Nationalist Party. Members of the Ulster Unionist Party contested the seat on three occasions, thrice winning more than 40% of the vote each time. The remaining elections were uncontested.

Members of Parliament

Election results 

At the 1929, 1933, 1938 and 1945 Northern Ireland general elections, Alex Donnelly was elected unopposed.

At the 1953 Northern Ireland general election, Roderick O'Connor was elected unopposed.

At the 1962, 1965 and 1969 Northern Ireland general elections, Roderick O'Connor was elected unopposed.

References

Northern Ireland Parliament constituencies established in 1929
Constituencies of the Northern Ireland Parliament
Historic constituencies in County Tyrone
Northern Ireland Parliament constituencies disestablished in 1973